Sven Vandousselaere (born 29 August 1988 in Bruges) is a Belgian cyclist.

Palmarès

2005
1st Aalst-Saint-Trond
2nd Flanders-Europe Classic Geraardsbergen
2nd Wortegem Koerse
2006
1st Junior Tour of Flanders
1st stages 1 and 2 Giro di Toscana juniors
1st stages 1 and 3 Kroz Istru
1st Omloop Mandel-Leie-Schelde 
2nd International Junioren Driedaagse
1st stage 1
2nd Liège-La Gleize
2nd Étoile du Sud-Limbourg
1st stage 3
3rd Paris–Roubaix juniors
2007
1st stage 2 Tour de Lleida
2008
1st stage 4 Tour de la province d'Anvers
2009
1st stage 4 Tour du Loir-et-Cher
2nd Internatie Reningelst
3rd Tour du Loir-et-Cher
2010
1st stage 5 Tour de Normandie
3rd Ronde van Vlaanderen U23
2012
3rd Belgian National Road Race Championships
2013
3rd Circuit Het Nieuwsblad

References

1988 births
Living people
Belgian male cyclists
Sportspeople from Bruges
Cyclists from West Flanders